Celaenorrhinus fritzgaertneri, or Fritzgaertner's flat, is a species of spread-wing skipper in the butterfly family Hesperiidae. It is found in Central America and North America.

Subspecies
These two subspecies belong to the species Celaenorrhinus fritzgaertneri:
 Celaenorrhinus fritzgaertneri fritzgaertneri
 Celaenorrhinus fritzgaertneri variegatus Godman & Salvin, 1894

References

Further reading

 

fritzgaertneri
Articles created by Qbugbot
Butterflies described in 1880